The A171 is a road in England that links the North Yorkshire towns of Middlesbrough, Guisborough, Whitby, Robin Hood's Bay and Scarborough. Locally it is known as The Moor Road. The road is mostly single carriageway but has some sections of dual carriageway. The distance between the two towns is 47 miles (75 km)

Settlements 
 Middlesbrough
 Ormesby
 Nunthorpe
 Guisborough
 Charltons
 Scaling
 Whitby
 Stainsacre
 Hawsker
 Cloughton
 Burniston
 Scalby
 Scarborough

Description 
The road starts on the A66 at Middlesbrough (South Bank) and heads south east through Ormesby to Nunthorpe where it turns east as a dual carriageway bypassing Guisborough and the road becomes single carriageway again. Just outside Guisborough it heads into the North York Moors National Park (forming its boundary at first). As it passes the village of Charltons, it rises up at a 15% incline through two 90° turns (the first east then the second south) up to Low Moor, this hill is named Birk Brow.

The road then wends its way through the open moorland of the North York Moors park past Scaling Dam and down into Whitby where it heads across Whitby new bridge. The bridge was built in 1980 at an projected cost of £1 million but the final amount was closer to £2 million.

The road then heads mostly in a south easterly direction out of Whitby bisecting Low & High Hawsker and then into open moorland again until it reaches the village of Cloughton where the National Park ends. It then heads due south through Burniston and Scalby before finishing in Scarborough at a junction with the A64 on Falsgrave Road.

Bus services 
The route is served by Arriva bus service X93. During the summer part of the timetable (which is the end of March to the start of November) the service is roughly one an hour in each direction.

A Park and Ride facility was opened at the junction with the B1460 outside of Whitby in 2014. The park has space for 450 vehicles and buses run every 15 minutes to and from the town between the hours of 10 am and 7 pm.

War monument 
At the roundabout junction with the A169 is a monument to the first German aircraft shot down over England in the Second World War. Three Hawker Hurricane aircraft of 43 Squadron, RAF Acklington shot down a Heinkel He 111 at Bannial Flat Farm just north of what is now the two A roads junction.

References

Roads in Yorkshire
Transport in North Yorkshire
Transport in Scarborough, North Yorkshire